Chief Bruno Obinna Iwuoha (died 10 April 2021) was a Nigerian actor. He won the Best Supporting Actor award at the 3rd Africa Movie Academy Awards for his performance in the movie "Sins of the Flesh".

Filmography
World Apart
Magic Cap
Keeping Close
Another Bondage
Faces Of Love
Days Of Hatred
Two Bad Boys
Double Mind
Eagle's Bride
Forever Yours
Jealous Lovers
My Own Share
My Portfolio
Occultic Battle
The Prince and The Princess
Sins Of The Flesh

References

External links

Nigerian male film actors
20th-century Nigerian male actors
21st-century Nigerian male actors
Best Supporting Actor Africa Movie Academy Award winners
1952 births
2021 deaths
Igbo male actors
Nigerian male television actors
Deaths from diabetes